Takla Lake Nation is a First Nation located around Takla Lake, 400 km north of Prince George, British Columbia, Canada. The main community is at Takla Landing, at the north end of Takla Lake, but the band services 17 reserves totaling 809 hectares. Takla Lake First Nation has approximately 650 members. It was created by the amalgamation of the Takla Lake and Fort Connelly bands in 1959.

Facilities
The main Takla reserve has a number of facilities including the following:
 band office
 community hall
 Nus Wadeezulh School
 health clinic
 church
 elders centre
 gym
 baseball field
 Takla Store, restaurant, motel, and fuel station.

The community is also home to the Nuswadeezulh Community School, offering Kindergarten to Grade 10, as well as adult education and alternate education classes. Nuswadeezulh means  "Looking into the Future".

A Royal Canadian Mounted Police detachment was established by agreement with Takla First Nation and opened in October 1999. The detachment has two designated native police officers and one corporal non-commissioned officer in charge.

Takla Lake is now accessible by an unpaved forestry road that branches off the Tache Road about 5 km short of the village of Tache. Until fairly recently, access was only by boat or float plane (see Takla Landing Water Aerodrome). Postal service is available at Takla Lake with mail pick-up and delivery once per week. Electricity has been provided since 1985. Previously, only the school, health station and  band office had electricity provided by diesel generators. Telephone and internet service has recently been switched from residential Telus lines to satellite service.

Governance and culture
Takla Lake First Nation has one chief and four councilors, all elected at large by the community.

The Takla Lake people currently speak predominantly English and the Babine dialect of Babine-Witsuwit'en, locally referred to as "Carrier". Until recently, many people also spoke Sekani, and some spoke Gitksan. Some people also speak the Stuart Lake dialect of Carrier. The overall identification of the community is as Carrier.

The potlatch system and clan system continue to play an important role.

Traditional skills of tanning hides, sewing, and beading of traditional garments have been maintained to a high degree. Elders are held in high esteem in the community, considered to be an important resource, and play an active role in the community.

Notes

External links
 Takla Lake First Nation, official website
 Indian and Northern Affairs Canada - First Nation Detail

Dakelh governments
Omineca Country
Babine